Teman, was the name of an Edomite clan and of its eponym, according to the Bible, and an ancient biblical town of Arabia Petraea. The term is also traditionally used in Biblical Hebrew as the synonym of the direction South and was applied to being used as the Hebrew name of Yemen (whose Arabic name is "Yaman") due to its location in the Southern end of the Arabian Peninsula, thus making Yemenite Jews being called "Temanim" in Hebrew.

In the Book of Genesis, the name Teman is referred to a son of Eliphaz, Esau's eldest son.
Job's friend Eliphaz was a Temani.

Location
According to bibleatlas.org and author W. Ewing, Teman or te'-man (תימן) means "on the right," i.e. "south" (Thaiman) and it is the name of a district and town in the land of Edom, named after Teman the grandson of Esau, the son of his firstborn, Eliphaz. A duke Teman is named among the chiefs or clans of Edom. He does not however appear first, in the place of the firstborn. Husham of the land of the Temanites was one of the ancient kings of Edom. From Book of Obadiah  we gather that Teman was in the land of Esau (Edom). In Book of Amos  it is named along with Bozrah, the capital of Edom.

In the Book of Ezekiel  desolation is pronounced upon Edom: "From Teman even unto Dedan shall they fall by the sword." From this it has been argued that Dedan (modern Arabic Al-`Ula) being in the south, Teman must, therefore, be in the north. But this does not automatically follow. Dedan is in fact in northern Arabia, being related to the peoples of Asshur or Assyria and other northern tribes . It is mentioned in proximity to Teman ; and when judgment is pronounced on Edom, the people of Dedan are warned to stay back; that is, to retreat into the desert . This understanding of Dedan is consistent with a southern Teman.

Eusebius' Onomasticon knows a district in the Gebalene region called Theman, and also a town with the same name, occupied by a Roman garrison, 15 miles from Petra. Unfortunately no indication of direction is given. No trace of the name has yet been found. It may have been on the road from Elath to Bozrah. The inhabitants of Teman seem to have been famous for their wisdom (Jeremiah , Book of Obadiah ). Eliphaz the Temanite was chief of the comforters of Job (etc.). The manner in which the city is mentioned by the prophets, now by itself, and again as standing for Edom, shows how important it must have been in their time.

According to some biblical scholars and commentators Teman was a city in the Land of Uz. In "The Comprehensive Commentary on the Holy Bible" it is written: "Throughout almost the whole of Hebrew history Uz or Idumea was regarded by the Jews in the same light of elegance and accomplishment, as Greece by the Romans, and Teman, the native city of Eliphaz, as the Athens of Arabia Petrea".

The Jewish Encyclopedia points out that the biblical genealogy and the references of the name "Teman": "proves that Teman was one of the most important of the Edomite tribes, and this is confirmed by the fact that "Teman" is used as a synonym for Edom itself (Amos i. 12; Obad. 9; comp. Jer. xlix. 20, 22; Hab. iii. 3). The Temanites were famed for their wisdom (Jer. xlix. 7; Baruch iii. 22)".

The exact location of Teman remains unknown, but there is a possibility that if the city of Teman ever existed as a more permanent location of shepherds during the time of Job, present-day Ma'an in Jordan could be its successor. The possible location of Teman given by bibleatlas.org is in the vicinity of the Jordanian town Ma'an.

There is other strong evidence that Teman could be identified in the site of the modern Ma'an. There is some information that says that the state which emerged in the south of the Arabian Peninsula in Yemen during the year 1200 BC extended its influence in the north and made the city of Ma'an a commercial and political center. The city acquired a gloss because of the abundance of its waters and this is true because we can assume it from the large number of springs and their ongoing. That time any residential community surrounded by a desert was built around water sources. The glitter of the site could be interpreted by its position as it became a stop of migratory convoys between the Arabian Peninsula and the Levant which were going there due to their need for the supply of water and food and to take a rest.

References

Edom